Palmyra High School may refer to:

 Palmyra High School, in Palmyra, Illinois
 Palmyra High School (Missouri), Marion County, Missouri
 Junior-Senior High School at Palmyra, a high school in Otoe County, Nebraska
 Palmyra High School (New Jersey), Palmyra, New Jersey
 Palmyra-Macedon High School, Palmyra, New York
 Palmyra Area High School, Palmyra, Pennsylvania
 Palmyra-Eagle High School, a high school in Palmyra, Wisconsin

See also
 Palmyra (disambiguation)